Celso Augusto Daniel (April 16, 1951 – January 18, 2002) was the mayor in 2002 for the third time (72% of votes) of the city of Santo André in São Paulo, Brazil, as a representative of the Workers' Party (PT). He was kidnapped and assassinated in the same year.

A civil engineer who graduated in 1973, from the Engenharia Mauá School, in São Caetano do Sul, he followed an academic career and obtained a master's degree in public administration from the Fundação Getúlio Vargas (FGV-SP) and a doctorate in political science from the Pontifícia Universidade Católica (PUC-SP). He acted later as a teacher in both universities. As mayor he was connected to the United Nations Urban Management Programme.

Celso Daniel's murder has not been properly solved by the local authorities, and the conclusions obtained by the investigations are still under dispute; the criminals who kidnapped him have been arrested but theories about their motivation for the crime vary from suggestions that it was a botched kidnapping attempt caused by a misunderstanding of the mayor's identity to theories that the crime was politically motivated and the killers were actually paid by figures of Daniel's own political party, PT. Since the beginning of the investigation, seven witnesses have been found dead.

Assassination
Celso Daniel was kidnapped on January 18, 2002, while leaving a restaurant late at night in the neighborhood of Jardins, in São Paulo. He left the restaurant in an armoured Pajero driven by his former body-guard Sérgio Gomes da Silva, nicknamed Sombra ("Shadow"). The car was followed by kidnappers in other cars, and near the number 393 of Rua Antônio Bezerra, in the neighborhood of Sacomã, the cars managed to block their path. Shots were fired against the tires and the glasses; Da Silva, who was the driver, said that at that moment the brakes and the transmission didn't work. According to him, the armed criminals opened the door of the car, grabbed the mayor and took him away, while he stayed in the area and remained unscathed.

On the morning of Sunday January 20, the body of Celso Daniel, with 11 gunshot wounds, was found in the Estrada das Cachoeiras in the neighborhood of Carmo in the city of Juquitiba, along the Régis Bittencourt Highway (BR-116).

Investigation
The São Paulo police concluded their investigation on April 1, 2002. According to their final report, presented by Armando de Oliveira Costa Filho of the Department of Homicide (DHPP), six individuals of a criminal gang from a favela called Pantanal in the southern part of São Paulo committed the crime. One of the accused, a minor, confessed to having shot the mayor.

The political investigation concluded that the criminals had kidnapped the mayor for profit and had mistaken him for a different person, a businessman whose identity was not revealed, supposedly the true target of the kidnapping.

The member of the criminal band were identified as: Rodolfo Rodrigo de Souza Oliveira (Bozinho), José Édson da Silva (Édson), Itamar Messias Silva dos Santos (Itamar), Marcos Roberto Bispo dos Santos (Marquinhos), and Elcyd Oliveira Brito (John). The leader of the group was identified as Ivan Rodrigues da Silva (Monstro, "Monster" in Portuguese). The area of his captivity was chosen by Édson, who had rented a spot in the city of Juquitiba for this purpose. Two cars were stolen for the kidnapping, a Chevrolet S-10 Blazer and a Volkswagen Santana. The gang assembled on January 17, 2002, and decided that the kidnapping would take place the following day.

In the afternoon of January 18, 2002, Monstro and Marquinhos left in one car and the other members in another; Monstro coordinated the operation with a cell phone. The members in the second car began to pursue the businessman they hoped to detain, but lost sight of his vehicle; Monstro then ordered them to abort the planned action and seize the passenger of the first expensive foreign car they encountered. The criminals continued to drive through the area and chose the Pajero of Celso Daniel and Sérgio Gomes as their target.

The group began to pursue the vehicle and eventually crashed into it. Itamar and Bonzinho exited their car firing at the Pajero and grabbed Celso Daniel from the car. He was then taken to the Pantanal favela, between Diadema and São Paulo. In the favela, the criminals took Daniel out of the Blazer, placed him in the Santana and drove him to their planned captivity spot in Juquitiba.

On January 19, the gang learned from the newspapers that they had kidnapped the mayor of Santo André. They were shocked and resolved to give up. Monstro told Edson that the victim had to be "dismissed". According to the other members of the gang, Monstro intended to communicate that the mayor should be freed. However, Edson claimed to have misinterpreted this remark as meaning he should be killed. He ordered an underage boy named Lalo to kill the mayor at the Estrada da Cachoeira, in Juquitiba. Two days later, his body was found with eight gunshot wounds.

Celso Daniel's family was not satisfied with the finding of the initial inquiry, and believe that the crime had a political motivation. An analysis of the car revealed that it did not have any electrical or mechanical faults, and they didn't accept Sérgio Gomes da Silva's story that these faults prevented an escape.
After the death of Celso Daniel, six other individuals were assassinated in an apparently mysterious manner, including the individual who found the body and the waiter who had served Celso Daniel the night of the crime.

One of public prosecutors showed the minor alleged to have fired the shot a photo of Celso Daniel, whom he apparently failed to recognize.

The family continued to press the authorities to reopen the case, and on August 5, 2002, the São Paulo State Attorney General agreed to launch a reopening.

Hypothesis of a political crime
Many members of the family continue to believe the crime had political motivations. According to Celso Daniel's brother, doctor João Francisco Daniel, he was murdered because he had prepared a report on corruption in Santo André.

João alleged that his brother was a part of a corruption scheme in Santo André used to divert funds to the Brazilians Worker's Party (PT). The supposed scheme involved members of the municipal government and businesspeople in the transportation sector, and key PT figures like José Dirceu and Gilberto Carvalho, Brazilian President Lula's  personal secretary. According to João, some members of the scheme began to divert funds illegally marked to PT into their own personal accounts. When Celso Daniel discovered this change, he supposedly prepared a report revealing the scheme. Because of this action, his brother says he was assassinated and the report disappeared.

The convict José Felício, also known as "Geleião", told the police that he had heard about this report and the accompanying threat to the mayor's life.

Sérgio Gomes da Silva was later indicted and accused of being the mastermind of the assassination in connection with the corruption scheme. He died of natural causes in 2016.

International Prizes received as a Mayor
 2002 Dubai International Awards for Best Practices
Granted by the United Nations Human Settlements Programme
Status of the premiation: Selected between 10 best practices in the world in a total of 550 subscriptions.

 2001 Habitat – UN Conference on Human Settlements – Istanbul
Granted by the United Nations (UN)
Status of the premiation: One of the sixteen best experiences in the world from an 800 projects subscribed.

 1999 Mayor friend of Children Programme
Granted by – Abrinq Foundation, supported by The United Nations Children's Fund (UNICEF)
Status of the Premiation: Highest award from 180 subscriptions.

There are also several awards received by Brazilian institutions and organizations.

See also
 Antonio da Costa Santos
 Corruption in Brazil
 List of kidnappings

References

External links
  Cobertura do Caso Celso Daniel, Folha de S.Paulo.
Justiça nega liminar a José Dirceu no caso Celso Daniel, O Estado de S. Paulo, 17 June 2005.
 Família de Celso Daniel decide pedir novo laudo O Estado de S. Paulo, 17 April 2005
Juíz acata denúncia no caso Celso Daniel em SP, Terra, 4 March 2005
 Justiça analisa nova denúncia no caso Celso Daniel, Terra, 20 January 2005
  Corruption Accusations Rise From Brazil Mayor's Death, The New York Times, 1 February 2004
Laudo aponta contradição no caso Celso Daniel, Terra, 26 May 2004
MP convocará assessor de Lula no caso Celso Daniel, Terra, 24 May 2005
Morte de Celso Daniel completa 2 anos sem solução Terra, 20 January 2004
Irmão de Celso Daniel mantém acusações ao PT Terra, 11 December 2003
Brazilians mourn kidnapped mayor, BBC News, 21 January 2002
Mayor's Killing In Brazil State Churns Politics And Stirs Rage, The New York Times, 22 January 2002

1951 births
2000s missing person cases
2002 deaths
20th-century Brazilian engineers
Assassinated Brazilian politicians
Assassinated mayors
Deaths by firearm in Brazil
Formerly missing people
Fundação Getulio Vargas alumni
Kidnapped Brazilian people
Mayors of places in Brazil
Missing person cases in Brazil
People from Santo André, São Paulo
People murdered in Brazil
Workers' Party (Brazil) politicians